The IRAM 30-meter telescope is a radio telescope used for astronomical observations in the millimeter range of wavelengths, operated by the Institute for Radio Astronomy in the Millimeter Range (IRAM) and located in the Sierra Nevada, Spain, close to the Pico Veleta peak. Its large surface and wide-angle camera make it suitable for the exploration of large cosmic objects such as interstellar clouds, birthplaces for stars, and even galaxies. The 30-meter telescope also allows astronomers to observe the black hole and the center of the Milky Way by granting access to parts of the southern skies. The IRAM is one of the most sensitive single dish radio telescopes in the world.

Each year, more than 200 scientists from all over the world visit this observatory to explore the universe at millimeter wavelengths, with interests going from the Solar System to interstellar dust and gas or cosmology. Together with IRAM's second facility, the NOEMA observatory, the 30-meter telescope is part of the global Event Horizon Telescope array. It was the only station in Europe to participate in the 2017 EHT observing campaign that produced the first-ever image of a black hole.

Operation 
Built over four years (1980-1984), the telescope operates at 2850 meters above sea level. Due to its large surface, the 30-meter telescope is highly sensitive and well-adapted to detect weak sources. The surface of the parabola with its 420 panels is adjusted to a precision of 55 micrometers, corresponding to the width of a human hair.

The telescope is equipped with a suite of heterodyne receivers and continuum cameras operating at wavelengths of around 0.8, 1, 2, and 3 millimeters. By pointing the telescope toward a celestial source, and then scanning and tracking the source, astronomers can build up radio images of complete galaxies or regions of star formation in the Milky Way. With its ability to observe simultaneously at several wavelengths, the telescope can produce multiple images of the same region at once.

IRAM offers guided tours through the observatory and public talks during the summer months.

Science 
Compared to optical astronomy, which is sensitive to the hot universe (stars are generally a few thousand degrees Celsius), radio telescopes that operate in the millimeter wavebands, such as the IRAM 30-meter telescope, can view the cold universe (around −250°C). Both IRAM facilities can see the formation of the first galaxies in the universe, observe super-giant black holes at the center of galaxies, analyze the chemical evolution and dynamics of nearby galaxies, detect organic molecules and possible key elements of life, and investigate the formation of stars and the appearance of planetary systems.

As part of the Event Horizon Telescope array, the IRAM 30-meter telescope obtained the first-ever image of a black hole. Despite primarily being known for its work in EHT, EHT is not the only area in which the IRAM has done pioneering work. For instance, the first high-resolution radio observations of the heart of the Milky Way galaxy and its black hole named Sagittarius A* were made in 1995 – with a combination of the IRAM 30-meter telescope and the NOEMA array (former Plateau de Bure Interferometer). The telescope also obtained the first complete and detailed radio images of nearby galaxies and their gases. Together with NOEMA, it discovered one-third of the interstellar molecules known to date.

Gallery

References

Radio telescopes